The 2022 Città di Forlì II was a professional tennis tournament played on hard courts. It was the fourth edition of the tournament which was part of the 2022 ATP Challenger Tour. It took place in Forlì, Italy between 10 and 16 January 2022.

Singles main-draw entrants

Seeds

 1 Rankings as of 3 January 2022.

Other entrants
The following players received wildcards into the singles main draw:
  Matteo Gigante
  Stefano Napolitano
  Luca Potenza

The following players received entry into the singles main draw as special exempts:
  Luca Nardi
  Mukund Sasikumar

The following player received entry into the singles main draw as an alternate:
  Francesco Forti

The following players received entry from the qualifying draw:
  Adrian Andreev
  Gijs Brouwer
  Paul Jubb
  Aidan McHugh
  Aldin Šetkić
  Alexey Vatutin

Champions

Singles

 Jack Draper def.  Jay Clarke 6–3, 6–0.

Doubles

 Sadio Doumbia /  Fabien Reboul def.  Nicolás Mejía /  Alexander Ritschard 6–2, 6–3.

References

Città di Forlì II
January 2022 sports events in Italy
2022 in Italian sport